Railey may refer to:

Places
Railey Creek, stream in Stone County, Missouri

People
Isham Railey McConnell (born 1916), American architect who studied under Frank Lloyd Wright
Jordan Railey (born 1992), American professional basketball player
Paige Railey (born 1987), American sailor who races in the Laser Radial division
Zach Railey (born 1984), American sailor and silver medallist at the 2008 Summer Olympics

See also
Raley
Riley (disambiguation)